Santiago Jacob Duckworth (June 13, 1865 – June 28, 1930), known locally as S. J. Duckworth, served in the California State Assembly for the 61st district from 1893 to 1895. He was as an early Monterey pioneer businessman, real estate developer, and visionary of Carmel-by-the-Sea. In 1889, he wanted to build a Catholic summer resort, bought the rights to develop the Carmel area, filed a subdivision map, and started selling lots. After an unccessful undertaking, he sold the property to James Franklin Devendorf in 1902, who went on to found the Carmel Development Company and Carmel-by-the-Sea and the Carmel Highlands in California, United States. Duckworth helped shape the early development of Carmel, bringing the first major developers and builders to Carmel, and attracting some of the first residents.

Early life 

Duckworth was born on June 13, 1865, in Monterey, California.  His mother, Josefa Romero (1834-1931), was the daughter of José Figueroa the Mexican Governor of Alta California from 1833 to 1835. His father was Lorenzo Santiago Duckworth (1831-1871). Lorenzo's mother was Antonia Armenta, whose father, José María Armenta, held the land grant to Rancho Point Pinos. He lost his father at the age of six. With his two older brothers, they were sent to Watsonville Orphan Asylum in Watsonville, California where they were educated by Fransican Fathers. At the age of eleven Duckworth he left to support his widowed mother.

On November 29, 1892, Duckworth married his first wife, widow Flora Manuel (1852-1903), daughter of Carmen Amesti McKinley (1824–1901) and James McKinley, at the St. Mary's Catholic Cathedral in San Francisco. Carmen Amesti was the daughter of Jose Amesti, who owned Rancho Los Corralitos a Mexican Land Grant. She died at a hospital in Watsonville, California, at 45 years of age, on October 19, 1903. He married his second wife, Eloisa Maria Pinto (1885-1961) on June 23, 1908, at the home of the bride's parents in Watsonville. Father P. D. Hassett, from the St Patrick's Catholic Church, gave the blessing at the wedding.

Professional background

In January 1883, Duckworth took a job at the Western Union in San Luis Obispo, California. He then moved to Nogales, Arizona in 1884, to work for the Mexico Railway Company and the Federal Telegraph Service in Sonora, California where he got the title of "Chief Operator." In 1886 he returned to Monterey. In 1887, he worked in real estate in Monterey with his brother, Belisario E. Duckworth (1858-1917).

Politician

In April 1890, he accepted the position as Deputy City Clerk of Monterey. In July 1890, he made an unsuccessful run for the Republican Party's nomination to the California State Assembly from Monterey County. He ran again in November 1892 and was nominated by Judge R. B. Carpenter for Monterey and was elected as a Republican to the State Assembly. He was a member of the California State Assembly for the 61st district from January 2, 1893, to January 7, 1895. He ran on the Republican ticket and was a Republican for most of his life.

On March 19, 1898, Duckworth was appointed deputy collector of customs under Harry Chenoweth at Nogales, Arizona.

Carmel City

In 1887, he and his brother, Belesario Edward Duckworth, set up a real estate and insurance company, named Duckworth Brothers on Alvarado Street in Monterey. By February 1889, the business was renamed from Duckworth Bros. to D. J. Duckworth, Real-Estate, Insurance Agent. In December of that year he added "Notary Public" to the billing.

On January 9, 1888, the Pacific Improvement Company wanted to extend the railroad from Monterey to the Carmel River. Duckworth wanted to use this railway to establish a Catholic retreat near the Carmel Mission, in Carmel. The Catholic retreat would be like the Methodist colony already in Pacific Grove, California and would be called "Carmel City." This tract of land was known as Rancho Las Manzanitas. In 1888, Duckworth approached French businessman and Monterey businessman Honoré Escolle, with his plan of building the Catholic Community.

On February 18, 1888, Escolle signed an agreement to sell  to Duckworth and his brother. The land began at the top of the Carmel Hill and ran past Hatton Ranch, down through Ocean Avenue to Junipero Avenue.

In March 1888, Duckworth authorized W. C. Little, of Monterey, to survey the Carmel property and write down a subdivision map of the townsite with 135 blocks divided into four tracks. On May 1, 1888, the map was registered with the County Recorder of Monterey County. Corner lots were twenty-five dollars and inside lots twenty dollars and business lots solf for fifty dollars. In July 1888, the sale of lots began.

In 1889, Chinese workers began make the ground level at the end of the railway line. In April 1889, Duckworth placed an announcement in the local newspapers for the sale of Carmel lots, highlighting the advantages of the lots, access to the Southern Pacific railroad. Chinese and Hispanic laborers cleared shrubs and marked off the lots. Cottages were built and business were started.

On July 1, 1889, Duckworth sold seven lots. In December 1889, he had sold another 207 lots and reserved five lots on the north side of Broadway Avenue (now Junipero), between 6th and Ocean Avenue for Carmel City's first hotel, Hotel Carmelo (now the Pine Inn). Most of the people that bought these lots were school teachers and administrators from San Francisco. However, the railroad was only extended from Monterey to the Asilimar in Pacific Grove, California.

Duckworth hired Abbie Jane Hunter as a sales agent for Carmel City, who had founded the Women's Real Investment Company in San Francisco. In 1892, she sent out postcards promoting Carmel City as Carmel-by-the-Sea. References to Carmel City as a Catholic resort were never used again. She created a bath house at the foot of Ocean Avenue in 1889. It had a cupola and widnows across the front to view the ocean. It was torn down in 1929.

On November 17, 1892, Duckworth decided to go into politics and directed all of his unsold lots to Escolle as agent.

In Panic of 1893 the United States went into a five-year depression that began in 1893 and ended in 1897. Sales were stagnant and the Carmel project was losing money. Hunter's agents, Dummage and Goldsmith, managed to sell three hundred more lots in Carmel. By 1895, the business of selling lots got did not improve. By 1900, Ms. Hunter's Carmel enterprise was almost bankrupt.

In 1902, real estate developer James Franklin Devendorf purchased all the unsold land in Carmel from Duckworth with financial backing of San Francisco attorney Frank Hubbard Powers who became his partner. They formed the Carmel Development Company on November 25, 1902, and established the artists and writers' colony that became Carmel-by-the-Sea, in 1903.

In 1903, Duckworth moved from Monterey County to Watsonville and had a  ranch near Pinto Lake in the Pajaro valley, about three miles northeast of Watsonville. He kept the reach until March 1915, when it was foreclosed for half its value. In August 1915, he was elected secretary of the Watsonville Chamber of Commerce.

Death
Duckworth returned to Arizona in early 1930 to manage the campaign of Senator Andrew Jackson Bettwy for the Democratic nomination for governor of Arizona. He was also an editor of the Arizona Democrat, a political paper.

Duckworth died of typhoid fever in Tucson Arizona on June 28, 1930, at the age of 68, at the St. Mary's hospital.

See also
 California's 61st State Assembly district

References

External links

 Carmel Heritage website
 The Carmel Monterey Peninsula Art Colony: A History
 Audio recording about the story of Santiago Duckworth and the Catholic Resort

1862 births
1930 deaths
People from Carmel-by-the-Sea, California
People from Monterey, California
20th-century American politicians
Republican Party members of the California State Assembly